Eva Johanna Andén (23 April 1886 – 26 March 1970) was a Swedish lawyer. She became the first woman member of the Swedish Bar Association on 14 March 1918.

Life
Eva Andén was born to the merchant Heribert Andén and Elin Forssman.

In 1907, she became a law student at the University of Uppsala, where she was the only female member of her class, and graduated in 1912.  In 1912–1913, she toured Sweden and gave legal lectures on behalf of the National Association for Women's Suffrage (Sweden); in 1913–1914 she was employed as a notary at the legal court of Falun, and in 1914–1915, she practiced law in the firm of Johan Tjerneld, secretary of the Swedish Bar Association.  In 1915, she took over the law firm of Anna Pettersson in Stockholm. The second woman lawyer in Sweden, Mathilda Staël von Holstein, practiced in her firm in 1919–1923.

Eva Andén had a successful career until her death, and was particularly engaged in cases of divorce, allowance and other cases involving women and children. Barbro Alving, Selma Lagerlöf and Astrid Lindgren were among her clients.   
She was a member of the government's state legal committee which advised the government in the law reforms regarding women and children, which underwent major reforms during the year in which women's suffrage was introduced, and she contributed to the reforms in which the rights of children out of wedlock were strengthened (1917) and the reformed marriage law in which married women were freed from the legal guardianship of their husbands in 1920–1921.

She often contributed articles in the press, regarding the law and women's rights in issues of marriage, inheritance, abortion and prostitution.  During the 1920s and 1930s she was a regular contributor to the liberal feminist weekly magazine Tidevarvet.

She never married, but lived with the legal secretary Lisa Ekedahl for many years. She had many friends, among them Aleksandra Kollontai, Karolina Widerström and Ellen Fries.

See also 
 First women lawyers around the world

References

Further reading 
 

1886 births
1970 deaths
Swedish suffragists
Burials at Uppsala old cemetery
Swedish women lawyers
20th-century Swedish lawyers
20th-century women lawyers
20th-century Swedish journalists
20th-century Swedish women